Arico is the name of a municipality and a village in the southeastern part of the island of Tenerife, one of the Canary Islands, Spain. It is part of the Province of Santa Cruz de Tenerife. The municipality is located in the southeastern part of the island, and extends for 178,76 square kilometers from the mountainous interior to the beaches on the Atlantic. Its estimated population is around 7,500. The TF-1 motorway passes through the eastern part of the municipality.

The city administration is located in Villa de Arico. The other villages located on this municipality are: Arico Nuevo, Arico Viejo, Abades, La Jaca, Tajao and Poris de Abona.

Sites of interest 

Typical villages in the mountains, lighthouses in Poris de Abona and Tajao, important free-climbing spot and scuba diving location on Tenerife.

Historical population

References

External links 

 Statistics: (Official Site of the Canarian Government (Spanish only))

Municipalities in Tenerife